= List of former Australian rules football competitions in Western Australia =

This is a list of former Australian Rules Football competitions in the Australian state of Western Australia.

== Carnivals ==
- Eastern Districts Football Carnival

Held annually between competitions in the southern part of the state. Held in early September, it often interrupts the local competitions' finals series.

Winners:

- 1928 Northam
- 1929
- 1930
- 1931
- 1932
- 1933
- 1934
- 1935
- 1936
- 1937
- 1938
- 1939
- 1940–1945 not held
- 1946
- 1947
- 1948
- 1949
- 1950
- 1951
- 1952
- 1953
- 1954

- Great Southern Football Carnival

Held annually between competitions in the southern part of the state. It is held in early September, often interrupting the local competitions finals series.

Winners:

- 1922 Albany
- 1923 Katanning
- 1924 Katanning
- 1925 Albany
- 1926 Katanning
- 1927 Narrogin
- 1928 Katanning
- 1929 Katanning
- 1930 Narrogin
- 1931 Narrogin
- 1932 Albany
- 1933 Narrogin
- 1934 Albany
- 1935 Albany
- 1936 Tambellup
- 1937 Wagin
- 1938 Wagin
- 1939 Wagin
- 1940–1945 not held
- 1946 Dumbleyung-Lake Grace
- 1947 Albany
- 1948 Dumbleyung-Lake Grace
- 1949 Albany
- 1950 Albany
- 1951 Katanning
- 1952 Albany
- 1953 Katanning
- 1954 Wagin

== Associations ==
- Albany Football Association (1897–1957)
  - Clubs included East Ward>East Albany>Railways, North Ward>Towns>North Albany, West Ward>West Albany>AIT>Royals
- Avon Valley Association (1898–1958)
  - Clubs included York, Beverley, Meckering, Northam Federals, Northam Towns, Northam Union, Toodyay
- Bruce Rock Football Association (1926–1959)
  - Clubs included Ardath-Babakin, Belka, Bruce Rock, Bruce Rock Magpies, Bruce Rock Rovers, Imperials, Kwolyin, Muntadgin, Narembeen, Narembeen Rovers, Narembeen Warriors, Shackleton, Towns
- Bunbury Football Association (1902–1952)
  - Clubs included Brunswick, Bunbury, Donnybrook, Lumpers, Pastimes, South Bunbury, Yarloop
- Busselton Football Association (1910–1953)
  - Clubs Included Busselton, Capel, Elgin, Lumpers, Pastimes, Railways, Ruabon, Stratham, Wanderers, West Brunswick.
- Coastal Football Association (1972–1991)
  - Clubs Included Cervantes, Dongara, Eneabba, Jurien Bay, Leeway
- Corrigin Football Association (1921–1970)
  - Clubs included Bendering, Bilbarin, Brookton, Bullaring, Bulyee, Corrigin, Corrigin Tigers, Dudinin, Gnerkadilling, Gorge Rock, Karlgarin, Kondinin, Kulin, Pengilly, West Bendering, Yealering, Yealering/Bullaring Rovers.
- Central Midlands Football Association
  - Clubs included Rovers, Warriors, Miling, Watheroo.
- Dalwallinu Football Association
  - Clubs included Ballidu, Buntine, Dalwallinu, Latham, Miamoon, Wubin
- Dampier Football Association (1913–1970)
  - Clubs Included Bencubbin, Kununoppin, Mukinbudin. Nungarin, Trayning, Yelbeni
- Denmark Football Association
  - Clubs included Colts, Rangers, Wanderers
- Donnybrook Football Association (1919-1954)
  - Clubs included: Argyle, Beelerup, Kirup, Donnybrook, Boyanup, Dardanup, Noggerup, Wanderers
- Dumbleyung Lake Grace Association
  - Clubs included Kukerin, Moulyinning, Dumbleyung, Lake Grace.
- East Avon Football Association
  - Clubs included Quairading, Cunderdin, Tammin, Kellerberrin, Meckering, Yorkrakine.
- Geraldton Football Association
  - Clubs included Fire Brigade, Rovers, Railway, Towns
- Exmouth Football Association
- Harvey Football Association
  - Clubs included: Brunswick, Harvey, Mornington, Woroona, Yarloop
- Harvey-Brunswick Football Association
  - Clubs included: Brunswick, Harvey, Mornington, Wokalup, Yarloop
- Irwin Football Association (1946–1959)
  - Clubs included Dongara, Mingenew, Walkaway, Yandanoola
- Katanning Football Association
  - Clubs included Wanderers, Imperials, Rovers, Kent. Kojonup, Woodanilling, Katanning.
- Koorda Football Association
  - Clubs included Gabbin, Cadoux, Boorallaining.
- Merrerin Football Association
  - Clubs included Towns, Railways, Baandee, Nukarni, Burracoppin.
- Mt Barker Football Association
  - Clubs included Rocky Gully, North Mt. Barker, Mt. Barker South, Cranbrook.
- Mullewa Football Association (1920–1962)
  - Clubs included Federals, Devils Creek, Railways, Rovers.
- Murray Districts Football League.
  - Club included Pinjarra, Waroona, Mandurah, Hills, United, Jarrahdale, Yarloop.
- Narrogin Football Association
  - Clubs included: Cuballing, Imperials, Towns, Railways, Williams, Boddington.
- Nelson Football Association
  - Clubs included Balingup, Boyup Brook, Bridgetown, Rovers, Bridgetown Warriors, Nunnup, Greenbushes.
- New Norcia Association.
- Norseman Football Association
  - Clubs included Towns, Tigers, Rovers.
- Northampton-Upper Chapman Football Association
  - Clubs included Towns, Rovers, Yuna, Nabawa, Naason.
- Northern Goldfield Football Association
  - Clubs included Leonora, Gwalia
- North Midlands Football Association
  - Clubs included Coorow, Camamah, Three Springs, Arrino.
- Perenjori - Morowa Football Association.
  - Clubs included Morawa, Perenjori, Merkanooka, Gutha, Caron, Koolanooka, Bowgada
- Pingelly-Brookton Football Association
  - Clubs included Pingelly, Brookton, Aldersyde, Kweda, Popanyinning, Pumphrys Wandering
- Southern Districts Football League (1959-1991)
  - Clubs included: Cranbrook, North Mt Barker, South Mt Barker, North Albany, Railways, Royals, Tambellup
- Perth Suburban Football Association (1922–1937)
  - Clubs included Bassendean, Belmont, Canning Districts, West Subiaco, Young Labour League.
- South Midlands Football Association
  - Clubs included Bindoon, Bullbrook, Gingin, Muchea
- South Suburban Football Association (1908– )
  - Armadale, Cannington, Gosnells, Kelmscott, Manningham.
- Tambellup Football Association
  - Clubs included Borden, Broomehill, Gnowangerup, Ongerup, Tambellup
- Victoria Plains Football Association.
  - Clubs included Callingiri Yericoin, Bolgart, Toodyay
- Warren Football Association
  - Clubs included Jardee, Deanmill, Pemberton, Palgarup, Manjimup.
- Wickerpin Football Association (1946–1959)
  - Clubs included: Dudinin, Harrismith, Malyalling, Toolibin, Wickepin, Yealering.
- Wiluna Association
  - Clubs included Rovers, United.
- Wyalkatchem Football Association
  - Clubs included Benjabbering, Korrielockering, Wyalkatchem
- Yilgarn Football Association
  - Clubs included: Bullfinch, Fire Brigades, Marvel Loch, Miners, Mt Palmer, Rovers, South Yilgarn, Towns, Unions, United, Westonia
